Lyudmyla Shevchenko (born February 4, 1970) is a former Ukrainian team handball player. She received a bronze medal with the Ukrainian national team at the 2004 Summer Olympics in Athens.

References

External links

1970 births
Living people
Ukrainian female handball players
Handball players at the 2004 Summer Olympics
Olympic bronze medalists for Ukraine
Olympic medalists in handball 

Medalists at the 2004 Summer Olympics